Jeon Seok-ho (born May 2, 1984) is a South Korean actor. He is known for his role in Kingdom as the incompetent magistrate. He starred in TV series such as Misaeng: Incomplete Life (2014), The Good Wife (2016) and Strong Woman Do Bong-soon (2017).

Filmography

Film

Television series

Awards and nominations

References

External links

1984 births
Living people
South Korean male television actors
South Korean male film actors
South Korean male stage actors